Adilet Nurkenuly Sadybekov (born 26 May 2002) is a Kazakh footballer who plays as a midfielder for Kairat and the Kazakhstan national team.

Club career
On 14 June 2022, Kairat announced the signing of Sadybekov on a contract until the end of 2024.

Career statistics

Club

International

Statistics accurate as of match played 25 September 2022

References

External links

2002 births
Living people
People from Aktobe
Kazakhstani footballers
Kazakhstan international footballers
Association football midfielders
Russian Second League players
Kazakhstan Premier League players
FC Kairat players
Kazakhstani expatriate footballers
Expatriate footballers in Russia
Kazakhstani expatriate sportspeople in Russia